Staro Selo is a village in the Municipality of Kobarid in the Littoral region of Slovenia.

Church

The church in the centre of the settlement is dedicated to Saint Leonard.

Gallery

References

External links

Staro Selo on Geopedia

Populated places in the Municipality of Kobarid